Andy Hinson (born c. 1931) is a retired American football coach and former player. He was the head coach of the Bethune–Cookman University Wildcats football team from 1976 to 1978 and Cheyney University of Pennsylvania Wolves from 1979 to 1984.

Hinson grew up in Camden, New Jersey and graduated from Camden High School in 1949 and coached football there for three seasons, earning recognition in 1973 as scholastic football coach of the year.

A graduate of Bethune–Cookman University, Hinson was named to the Little All–American team in 1952.

Head coaching record

College

References

Year of birth missing (living people)
Living people
Bethune–Cookman Wildcats football coaches
Bethune–Cookman Wildcats football players
Cheyney Wolves football coaches
High school football coaches in Florida
High school football coaches in New Jersey
Camden High School (New Jersey) alumni
Sportspeople from Camden, New Jersey
Coaches of American football from New Jersey
Players of American football from Camden, New Jersey
African-American coaches of American football
African-American players of American football
20th-century African-American sportspeople
21st-century African-American sportspeople